The following is a list of local bus agencies in the United States, ranked by ridership.  All figures are unlinked passenger trips for the stated time period and come from the American Public Transportation Association's Quarterly "Public Transportation Ridership Reports".

APTA List 
These figures are from the largest bus agencies ridership table in the American Public Transportation Association's Quarterly "Public Transportation Ridership Reports". APTA categorizes large bus agencies as those which operate in urbanized areas of more than one million inhabitants and operate 300 or more peak hour buses.

Other Large Systems 
The APTA largest bus agencies table excludes many large bus agencies in the United States. Below is a list of other bus agencies with more than 10 million unlinked passenger trips from the APTA Quarterly Report that are not found in the largest agencies table.

See also
List of bus transit systems in the United States
List of rapid transit systems
List of light-rail transit systems
List of United States light rail systems by ridership
List of United States rapid transit systems by ridership
List of suburban and commuter rail systems
List of United States commuter rail systems by ridership

Notes

References

United States local bus agencies by ridership
Bus